Stênio Akiro Yamamoto (born June 24, 1961 in São Paulo) is a Brazilian sport shooter of Japanese descent. He won a silver medal in the free pistol at the 2007 ISSF World Cup series in Munich, Germany, with a score of 660.8 points.

At age forty-seven, Yamamoto made his official debut for the 2008 Summer Olympics in Beijing, where he competed in two pistol shooting events. He scored a total of 568 targets in the preliminary rounds of the men's 10 m air pistol, by one point ahead of Romania's Iulian Raicea, finishing only in forty-third place. Three days later, Yamamoto placed forty-fourth in his second event, 50 m pistol, by two points behind Tajikistan's Sergey Babikov, with a total score of 538 targets.

References

External links
Profile – UOL Esporte 
NBC 2008 Olympics profile

Brazilian male sport shooters
Brazilian people of Japanese descent
Living people
Olympic shooters of Brazil
Shooters at the 2008 Summer Olympics
Pan American Games competitors for Brazil
Shooters at the 2003 Pan American Games
Sportspeople from São Paulo
1961 births